Elwood Graham was a state legislator in Illinois. He served in the Illinois House from 1956 to 1970. He was a Republican.

See also
List of African-American officeholders (1900–1959)

References

Year of birth missing (living people)
Living people